Contwig is a municipality in Südwestpfalz district, in Rhineland-Palatinate, western Germany. It has slightly over 5.000 inhabitants, and is part of the Verbandsgemeinde Zweibrücken-Land. Its current mayor is Nadine Brinette, elected in 2021.

References 

Municipalities in Rhineland-Palatinate
Südwestpfalz